The , branded , is a DC electric multiple unit (EMU) train type operated by East Japan Railway Company (JR East) in Japan. It was introduced into commercial service on 2 July 1993, and was specifically designed to be used limited express services from Tokyo to the Bōsō Peninsula.

Design
The trains were built jointly by Kinki Sharyo and Tokyu Car, with a steel body design based directly on the earlier 253 series EMUs built for Narita Express services, although the window height was increased by 100 mm. It is the first JR East limited express rolling stock to feature VVVF Gate turn-off thyristor traction control systems, based on the results of trials with the prototype 209 series commuter EMUs.

DT56E bogies are used on motored cars, and TR241E bogies are used on trailer cars.

Operations

Sōbu Main Line
 Shiosai: Tokyo -  (since 10 December 2005)

Sotobō Line
 Wakashio:  - Tokyo
 Shinjuku Wakashio: Shinjuku -

Formations
The five 9-car sets, numbered Be01 to Be05, are formed as shown below, with car 1 at the Tokyo end. Trains consist of four motored "MoHa" and five "KuHa", "SaHa", and "SaRo" trailer cars.

Cars 2 and 8 are each equipped with one PS26A scissors-type pantograph.

Passenger facilities
 Green (first class) car: Car 4
 Toilets: Cars 2, 4, 5, 7, 9
 Wheelchair space: Car 5
 Telephone: Car 4

Interior

History

The first two sets, Be01 and Be02, were delivered in March and April 1993, entering revenue service from 2 July 1993 on View Wakashio and View Sazanami limited express services. Three more sets, Be03 to Be05, were delivered in October and November 1994.

From the start of the revised timetable on 12 December 2000, the Green car (car 4) was made entirely no smoking.

The destination indicators on the sides of cars were changed from the original roller blind type to LED indicators between October and November 2005.

From the start of the revised timetable on 10 December 2005, View Wakashio and View Sazanami services were renamed simply Wakashio and Sazanami, and 255 series sets were also introduced on Shiosai services. All cars were made no-smoking from this date.

The front-end skirt design was modified during 2010.

See also
 E257 series, also used on Bōsō limited express services

References

External links

 255 series Shiosai/Wakashio/Sazanami 

Electric multiple units of Japan
East Japan Railway Company
Train-related introductions in 1993
Kinki Sharyo multiple units
Tokyu Car multiple units
1500 V DC multiple units of Japan